Marina Serkova (born 12 September 1961) is a Soviet athlete. She competed in the women's high jump at the 1980 Summer Olympics.

References

1961 births
Living people
Athletes (track and field) at the 1980 Summer Olympics
Soviet female high jumpers
Olympic athletes of the Soviet Union
Place of birth missing (living people)